The Enggano hill myna or Enggano myna (Gracula enganensis) is a member of the starling family. It is an endemic resident of Enggano Island, off southwest Sumatra. Clements lumps this species with the common hill myna.

Description
The Enggano hill myna is stocky with mainly black plumage. It has bright orange-yellow patches of naked skin and fleshy yellow wattles on the side of its head and nape.

It has overall turquoise-glossed black plumage, purple-tinged on the head and neck. There are large white wing patches which are obvious in flight. The thick bill and strong legs are bright yellow.

Behaviour
The bird is arboreal and is found mainly along forest edges. Like most starlings, the Enggano hill myna is fairly omnivorous, eating fruit, nectar and insects.

References

Enggano hill myna
Birds of Enggano
Enggano hill myna